This article contains information about the literary events and publications of 1957.

Events
January 10 – T. S. Eliot marries his secretary Valerie Fletcher, 30 years his junior, in a private church ceremony in London. His first wife, Vivienne Haigh-Wood, died in 1947.
January 15 – The film Throne of Blood, a reworking of Macbeth by Akira Kurosawa (黒澤明), is released in Japan.
March – The Cat in the Hat, written and illustrated by Theodor Geisel as 'Dr. Seuss' as a more entertaining alternative to traditional literacy primers for children, is first published in a trade edition in the United States, initially selling an average of 12,000 copies a month, a figure which rises rapidly. 
March 13 – A 1950 Japanese translation of D. H. Lawrence's Lady Chatterley's Lover by Sei Itō (伊藤整) is found on appeal to be obscene.
March 15 – Élet és Irodalom (Life and Literature) is first published in Hungary as a literary magazine.
March 21 – C. S. Lewis marries Joy Gresham in a Christian ceremony at her bedside in the Churchill Hospital, Oxford, England.
March 25 – Copies of Allen Ginsberg's Howl and Other Poems (first published 1 November 1956) printed in England are seized by United States Customs Service officials in San Francisco on grounds of obscenity. On October 3, in People v. Ferlinghetti, a subsequent prosecution of publisher Lawrence Ferlinghetti in the city, the work is ruled not to be obscene.
April – John Updike moves to Ipswich, Massachusetts, the model for the fictional New England town of Tarbox in his 1968 novel Couples.
June 2 – Joe Orton submits The Last Days of Sodom, a novel jointly written with Kenneth Halliwell, to a publisher; it is rejected within three days and they give up working in partnership.
July 1 – The opening performance is held at the Stratford Shakespearean Festival's Festival Theatre in Stratford, Ontario, with its thrust stage designed by Tanya Moiseiwitsch.
August 7 – Italo Calvino's letter of resignation from the Italian Communist Party appears in l'Unità.
October – The first American Beat Generation (poets Allen Ginsberg and Peter Orlovsky) stay at the "Beat Hotel" (Hotel Rachou) in Paris.
November 22 – Boris Pasternak's novel Doctor Zhivago is first published, in Italian translation, by Giangiacomo Feltrinelli in Milan, having been rejected for publication in the Soviet Union.
unknown dates
Justine, the first novel in Lawrence Durrell's The Alexandria Quartet, is published. The last will be published in 1960.
Dorothy Parker begins writing book reviews for Esquire.
E. E. Cummings gains a special citation from the National Book Award Committee in the United States for his Poems, 1923–1954.
Malcolm Muggeridge is replaced by Bernard Hollowood as editor of the British Punch magazine.
The Harry Ransom Center for research in the humanities is founded in the University of Texas at Austin by Harry Ransom.
John Sandoe opens a bookshop in Chelsea, London.
Noh is inscribed as an Intangible Cultural Property (Japan).
Three neo-Grotesque sans-serif typefaces are released: Folio (designed by Konrad Bauer and Walter Baum), Neue Haas Grotesk (Max Miedinger) and Univers (Adrian Frutiger), will influence the International Typographic Style of graphic design.

New books

Fiction
Caridad Bravo Adams – Corazón salvaje
Lars Ahlin – Natt i marknadstältet (Night in the Market Tent)
Isaac Asimov
Earth Is Room Enough
The Naked Sun
John Bingham – Murder Off the Record
John Braine – Room at the Top
Fredric Brown – Rogue in Space
Pearl S. Buck – Letter from Peking
Michel Butor – La Modification
John Dickson Carr – Fire, Burn!
Louis-Ferdinand Céline – Castle to Castle (D'un château l'autre)
John Cheever – The Wapshot Chronicle
Agatha Christie – 4.50 from Paddington
Mark Clifton and Frank Riley – They'd Rather Be Right
Ivy Compton-Burnett – A Father and His Fate
Thomas B. Costain – Below the Salt
James Gould Cozzens – By Love Possessed
L. Sprague de Camp – Solomon's Stone
 Freeman Wills Crofts – Anything to Declare?
Cecil Day-Lewis – End of Chapter
Daphne du Maurier – The Scapegoat
Lawrence Durrell – Justine
Shusaku Endo (遠藤 周作) – The Sea and Poison (海と毒薬)
Ian Fleming
The Diamond Smugglers
From Russia, with Love
Janet Frame – Owls Do Cry
Sarah Gainham 
 The Cold Dark Night
 The Mythmaker
Jean Giono – The Straw Man (Le Bonheur fou)
José Giovanni – The Break (Le Trou)
Martyn Goff – The Plaster Fabric
Richard Gordon – Doctor in Love
Winston Graham – Greek Fire
L.P. Hartley – The Hireling
Bill Hopkins – The Divine and the Decay
Aldous Huxley – Collected Short Stories
James Jones – Some Came Running
Anna Kavan – Eagle's Nest
Jack Kerouac – On the Road
Frances Parkinson Keyes – Blue Camellia
Christopher Landon – Ice Cold in Alex
Halldór Laxness – The Fish Can Sing (Brekkukotsannáll)
Chin Yang Lee – The Flower Drum Song
Meyer Levin – Compulsion
H. P. Lovecraft and August Derleth – The Survivor and Others
Compton Mackenzie – Rockets Galore
Józef Mackiewicz – Kontra
Alistair MacLean
The Guns of Navarone
South by Java Head
Naguib Mahfouz – Sugar Street
Bernard Malamud – The Assistant
Richard Mason – The World of Suzie Wong
James A. Michener – Rascals in Paradise
Gladys Mitchell – The Twenty-Third Man
Nancy Mitford – Voltaire in Love
C. L. Moore – Doomsday Morning
Elsa Morante – L'isola di Arturo
Sławomir Mrożek – Słoń (The Elephant, short stories)
Iris Murdoch – The Sandcastle
Vladimir Nabokov – Pnin
Björn Nyberg and L. Sprague de Camp – The Return of Conan
Marcel Pagnol – Le Château de ma mère
Boris Pasternak – Doctor Zhivago
Anthony Powell – At Lady Molly's
Maurice Procter – The Midnight Plumber
Qu Bo (曲波) – Tracks in the Snowy Forest (林海雪原)
Ayn Rand – Atlas Shrugged
Robert Randall (pseudonym of Robert Silverberg and Randall Garrett) – The Shrouded Planet
Alain Robbe-Grillet – La Jalousie
Nevil Shute – On the Beach
Robert Paul Smith – Where Did You Go? Out. What Did You Do? Nothing
Muriel Spark – The Comforters
Howard Spring – Time and the Hour
John Steinbeck – The Short Reign of Pippin IV
Rex Stout
Three for the Chair
If Death Ever Slept
 Julian Symons – The Colour of Murder
Kay Thompson – Eloise in Paris
Roger Vailland – La Loi
Jack Vance – Big Planet
Arved Viirlaid – Seitse kohtupäeva (Seven Days of Trial)
Henry Wade – The Litmore Snatch
Evelyn Waugh – The Ordeal of Gilbert Pinfold
Patrick White – Voss
Angus Wilson – A Bit Off the Map
John Wyndham – The Midwich Cuckoos
Ivan Yefremov – Andromeda Nebula
Frank Yerby – Fairoaks

Children and young people
Mabel Esther Allan – Ballet for Drina
Gillian Avery – The Warden's Niece
Rev. W. Awdry – The Eight Famous Engines (twelfth in The Railway Series of 42 books by him and his son Christopher Awdry)
Narain Dixit – Khar Khar Mahadev (serialized)
Aileen Fisher – A Lantern in the Window
Edward Gorey – The Doubtful Guest
Éva Janikovszky – Csip-csup (Piffling)
Tove Jansson – Moominland Midwinter (Trollvinter)
Harold Keith – Rifles for Watie
Elinor Lyon – Daughters of Aradale
William Mayne – A Grass Rope
Otfried Preußler – Die kleine Hexe (The Little Witch)
Dr. Seuss
The Cat in the Hat
How the Grinch Stole Christmas!
Pat Smythe – Jacqueline Rides for a Fall (first of the Three Jays series of seven books)
Elizabeth George Speare – Calico Captive
Tomi Ungerer – The Mellops Go Flying
Dare Wright – The Lonely Doll

Drama
Samuel Beckett – Endgame and Act Without Words I (first performed); All That Fall and From an Abandoned Work (first broadcast of both)
Emilio Carballido – El censo
William Douglas Home – The Iron Duchess
Christopher Fry – The Dark is Light Enough
Jean Genet – The Balcony (Le Balcon)
Günter Grass – Flood (Hochwasser)
Graham Greene – The Potting Shed
William Inge – The Dark at the Top of the Stairs
Errol John – Moon on a Rainbow Shawl
Bernard Kops – The Hamlet of Stepney Green
John Osborne
The Entertainer
Epitaph for George Dillon
Harold Pinter – The Dumb Waiter (written)
N. F. Simpson – A Resounding Tinkle
Wole Soyinka – The Invention
Boris Vian – Les Bâtisseurs d'Empire (The Empire Builders)
Tennessee Williams
Baby Doll
Orpheus Descending

Poetry
Robert E. Howard – Always Comes Evening
Ted Hughes – The Hawk in the Rain
Pier Paolo Pasolini – Le ceneri di Gramsci
Octavio Paz – Piedra de Sol
Jibanananda Das – Rupasi Bangla
Robert Penn Warren – Promises: Poems, 1954–1956.  Won National Book Award for Poetry  – Won 1958 Pulitzer Prize for Poetry

Non-fiction
Abd al-Majīd Bin Jallūn – Fī al-Ṭufūla
B. R. Ambedkar (died 1956) – The Buddha and His Dhamma
G. E. M. Anscombe – Intention
Catherine Drinker Bowen – The Lion and the Throne: The Life and Times of Sir Edward Coke (1552–1634) (winner, 1958 National Book Award for Nonfiction)
Gerald Brenan – South from Granada: Seven Years in an Andalusian Village
M. Đilas – The New Class
Will Durant – The Reformation. Nominated for National Book Award for Nonfiction
Elisabeth Elliot – Through Gates of Splendor
Charles Evans – Kangchenjunga: The Untrodden Peak
Douglas Southall Freeman – George Washington: A Biography. Won 1958 Pulitzer Prize for Biography. Nominated for National Book Award for Nonfiction
Northrop Frye – Anatomy of Criticism: Four Essays
Louis M. Hacker – Alexander Hamilton in the American. Nominated for National Book Award for Nonfiction
Bray Hammond – Banks and Politics in America.  Won 1958 Pulitzer Prize for History
Gilbert Highet – Poets in a Landscape. Nominated for 1958 National Book Award for Nonfiction
Richard Hoggart – The Uses of Literacy
Eric John Holmyard – Alchemy
Stuart Holroyd – Emergence from Chaos
Ernst Kantorowicz – The King's Two Bodies
Henry Kissinger – Nuclear Weapons and Foreign Policy. Nominated for National Book Award for Nonfiction
Primo Levi – If This Is a Man (Se Questo è un Uomo)
Art Linkletter – Kids Say the Darndest Things
Christopher Lloyd – The Mixed Border
Mary McCarthy – Memories of a Catholic Girlhood. Nominated for National Book Award for Nonfiction
Tom Maschler (ed.) – Declaration (anthology)
Eliot Ness and Oscar Fraley – The Untouchables
Iris Origo – The Merchant of Prato (life and commercial career of Francesco di Marco Datini)
Walt Whitman Rostow & Max F. Milliken – A Proposal: Key to an Effective Foreign Policy. Nominated for National Book Award for Nonfiction
Jean-Paul Sartre – Search for a Method (Questions de méthode)
David Schoenbrun – As France Goes. Nominated for National Book Award for Nonfiction
Rodolfo Walsh – Operación Masacre
Ian Watt – The Rise of the Novel: Studies in Defoe, Richardson and Fielding
Alan Watts – The Way of Zen
K. A. Wittfogel – Oriental Despotism

Births
January 7 – Nicholson Baker, American novelist
January 16 – Stella Tillyard, English writer and historian
January 22 – Francis Wheen, English journalist and author
January 27 – Frank Miller, American comic-book cartoonist and scriptwriter
February 11 – Mitchell Symons, English writer and journalist
March 3 – Nicholas Shakespeare, English novelist and biographer
March 7 – Robert Harris, English novelist and current-affairs writer
March 23 – Ananda Devi, Mauritian francophone fiction writer and poet
March 26 – Paul Morley, English music journalist
March 29 – Elizabeth Hand, American science fiction and fantasy writer
April 3
Rainer Karlsch, German historian
Unni Lindell, Norwegian novelist
May 13 – Koji Suzuki, Japanese author and screenwriter
May 17 – Peter Høeg, Danish novelist
May 23 – Craig Brown, English satirist
June 8 – Scott Adams, American satirist
July 14 – Andrew Nicholls, English-born Canadian screenwriter
July 29 – Liam Davison, Australian novelist (died 2014 in air crash)
August 24 – Stephen Fry, English comedy performer, broadcast presenter and writer
September 22 – Nick Cave, Australian author and musician
October 28 - Catherine Fisher, British poet and children's writer
November 14 – Michael J. Fitzgerald, American technical writer
December 3 – Anne B. Ragde, Norwegian novelist
December 11 – William Joyce, American children's author
December 12 – Robert Lepage, Canadian playwright
unknown dates
Peter Armstrong, English poet and psychotherapist
John Doyle, Irish-born Canadian critic
Ana Santos Aramburo, Spanish national librarian
Melanie Rae Thon, American author

Deaths
January 10 – Gabriela Mistral , Chilean poet (born 1889)
January 13 – A. E. Coppard, English short story writer and poet (born 1878)
January 19 – Barbu Lăzăreanu, Romanian literary historian, poet, and communist journalist (heart attack, born 1881)
February 10 – Laura Ingalls Wilder, American author (born 1867)
March 7 – Wyndham Lewis, British novelist (born 1882)
March 9 – Rhoda Power, English children's writer and broadcaster (born 1890)
March 12 – John Middleton Murry, English critic (born 1889)
March 28 – Christopher Morley, American journalist, novelist and poet (born 1890)
March 29 – Joyce Cary, Irish novelist (born 1888)
April 22 – Roy Campbell, South African poet and satirist (born 1901)
June 17
May Edginton, English popular novelist (born 1883)
Dorothy Richardson, English novelist and journalist (born 1873)
June 26 
 Alfred Döblin, German novelist (born 1878)
 Malcolm Lowry, English novelist and poet (born 1909)
July 10 – Sholem Asch, Polish-Jewish novelist, dramatist and essayist (born 1880)
July 19 – Curzio Malaparte, Italian novelist, playwright, and journalist (cancer, born 1898)
July 21 – Kenneth Roberts, American historical novelist (born 1885)
July 23 – Giuseppe Tomasi di Lampedusa, Italian novelist (born 1896)
August 1 – Rose Fyleman, English writer and poet (born 1877)
August 21 – Mait Metsanurk, Estonian writer (born 1879)
August 25 – Leo Perutz, Austrian-born novelist and mathematician (born 1882) 
September 2 – William Craigie, Scottish lexicographer (born 1867)
September 12 – José Lins do Rego, Brazilian novelist (born 1901)
September 22 – Oliver St. John Gogarty, Irish poet and memoirist (born 1878)
October 25 – Edward Plunkett, Baron Dunsany, Irish author (born 1878)
October 26 – Nikos Kazantzakis, Greek novelist (born 1883)
November 8 – Ernest Elmore (John Bude), English crime writer and theatre director (born 1901)
November 24 – Alfred Eckhard Zimmern, English historian and political scientist (born 1879)
December 15 – Mulshankar Mulani, Gujarati playwright (born 1867)
December 17 – Dorothy L. Sayers, English crime novelist (born 1893)
December 24 – Arturo Barea, Spanish journalist, broadcaster and writer (born 1897)
December 25 – Stanley Vestal, American writer, poet and historian (born 1877)

Awards
Carnegie Medal for children's literature: William Mayne, A Grass Rope
James Tait Black Memorial Prize for fiction: Anthony Powell, At Lady Molly's
James Tait Black Memorial Prize for biography: Maurice Cranston, Life of John Locke
Miles Franklin Award: Patrick White, Voss
Newbery Medal for children's literature: Virginia Sorenson, Miracles on Maple Hill
Nobel Prize for Literature: Albert Camus
Premio Nadal: Carmen Martín Gaite, Entre visillos
Prix Goncourt: Roger Vailland, La Loi
Pulitzer Prize for Drama: Eugene O'Neill, Long Day's Journey into Night
Pulitzer Prize for Fiction: no award given
Pulitzer Prize for Poetry: Richard Wilbur: Things of This World
Queen's Gold Medal for Poetry: Siegfried Sassoon

Notes

References

 
Years of the 20th century in literature